Alexera is a genus of longhorn beetles of the subfamily Lamiinae, containing the following species:

 Alexera barii (Jekel, 1861)
 Alexera secunda Martins & Galileo, 2007

References

Onciderini